Hypselodoris babai is a species of colourful sea slug or dorid nudibranch, a marine gastropod mollusc in the family Chromodorididae.

Distribution
This nudibranch was described from Seragaki, Okinawa, Japan. It has been reported from the Western Pacific Ocean from Australia to Okinawa.

Description
Hypselodoris babai has a bright orange body with a white lined mantle and foot. It has white spots on its dorsum and body. The gills and rhinophores are orange. This species can reach a total length of at least 40 mm and has been observed feeding on sponges from the genus Euryspongia.

References

Chromodorididae
Gastropods described in 2000